O3b is a telecommunications satellite

O3b may also refer to:
 O3b mPOWER, a planned second generation satellite
 O3b Networks (2007–2017) a defunct satellite operator

Satellites